Darren Kappler (born 23 January 1965) is a former professional Australian rules footballer.

Recruited from South Australian National Football League club South Adelaide, Kappler played 187 games for Fitzroy, the Sydney Swans and Hawthorn in the Australian Football League.  During his AFL career Kappler built a reputation as a talented and damaging long kicking left footed wingman.

After retiring from AFL football, Kappler served as playing coach at the Murrumbeena Football Club in the Southern Football League for several seasons before switching first to Canterbury Football Club and currently the Caulfield Football Club.

In 1999 Darren Kappler spent one season with the Glenorchy Football Club in the now defunct Tasmanian Football League that season Glenorchy won the Premiership which was the clubs first since 1988. The side was coached by former Essendon star Paul Hamilton who was assisted by current Dodges Ferry coach Danny Ling. Kappler flew in, and flew out of Tasmania, never training with the club. 

Kappler's brother David Kappler played over 200 games for South Adelaide.

References

External links

Australian rules footballers from South Australia
South Adelaide Football Club players
Sydney Swans players
Fitzroy Football Club players
Hawthorn Football Club players
Mitchell Medal winners
Glenorchy Football Club players
Caulfield Football Club players
1965 births
Living people
Reynella Football Club players
Australian rules football coaches
Caulfield Football Club coaches